Club Deportivo Pacífico FC is a Peruvian football club. Based in the San Martín de Porres District, in the department of Lima, it plays in Peru's Second Division.

History
The club was founded on the January 1, 1960 under the name of  Club Deportivo Pacífico FC in the city of San Martín de Porres, Lima.

In the 2011 Copa Perú, the club was defeated by Real Garcilaso in the finals and was granted promotion to the 2012 Peruvian Segunda División. The team performed very well in the Segunda División where it only lost two games and achieved promotion to the Primera División. It competed in the 2013 Torneo Descentralizado. The club was relegated to the 2014 Peruvian Segunda División, when it was defeated by Unión Comercio in the relegation playoff.

Current squad

Honours

National
Segunda División: 1
Winners (1): 2012

Copa Perú: 0
Runner-up (1): 2011

Regional
Región IV: 1
Winners (1): 2011

Liga Departamental de Lima: 0
Runner-up (1): 2011

Liga Provincial de Lima: 1
Winners (1): 2011

Liga Distrital de San Martín de Porres: 1
Winners (1): 2010
Runner-up (1): 2011

See also
List of football clubs in Peru
Peruvian football league system

References

External links
 Sitio web en Facebook

Football clubs in Peru
Association football clubs established in 1960